The Dangerous Blonde is a 1924 American silent romantic comedy film directed by Robert F. Hill and starring Laura La Plante. It was produced and distributed by Universal Pictures.

Cast

Preservation
With no prints of The Dangerous Blonde located in any film archives, it is a lost film.

References

External links

Lobby poster

1924 films
Lost American films
Films directed by Robert F. Hill
Universal Pictures films
American silent feature films
American black-and-white films
American romantic comedy films
1924 romantic comedy films
1924 lost films
1920s American films
Silent romantic comedy films
Silent American comedy films